The Project 1743 Omskiy type ships are a class of large dry cargo ships built from 1972 until 1995 in the Soviet Union, Russian Federation, and Romania.

Description 
They are big dry cargo ships with four covered holds, as well as a double bottom and sides. Omskiy type ships are powered by two diesel engines with 515 kW of power each.

There are three types of Omskiy type ships: Project 1743, Project 1743.1, and Project 1743.7. Project 1743 are the original cargo ships, while the 1743.1 and 1743.7 variants are modernized subclasses. The 1743.1 ships have a different interior of the superstructure as well as the placement of the two funnels and the form of the stern. The 1743.7 ships are longer and have two cranes for loading and unloading.

History 
Omskiy type ships were built in the Soviet Union and then Russia from 1972 until 1995, and in Romania from 1977 until 1991. The Project 1743.1 and 1743.7 were all built in the 1990s- with modernized equipment for river-sea operations. Around 140 ships were built in total, with 108 from Project 1743, 26 from Project 1743.1, and 7 from Project 1743.7.

Most of the ships were designed for use in the Lena and Ob-Irtysh river basins, and some were named after Siberian towns. A few ships were delivered to the Yenisey and Amur river basins, or to Europe. In the 1990s, most of the ships were transferred out of Russia to Europe or East Asia, and some were sold to foreign shipping lines to take on more convenient flags.

List of ships

References 

Cargo ships of Russia
Ship classes